Mimandria diospyrata is a moth of the family Geometridae first described by Jean Baptiste Boisduval in 1833. It is found on Réunion and Mauritius in the Indian Ocean.

References

Moths described in 1833
Pseudoterpnini
Moths of Mauritius
Moths of Réunion